The United States District Court for the Southern District of Illinois (in case citations, S.D. Ill.)  is a federal district court covering approximately the southern third of the state of Illinois.

Appeals from the Southern District of Illinois are taken to the United States Court of Appeals for the Seventh Circuit (except for patent claims and claims against the U.S. government under the Tucker Act, which are appealed to the Federal Circuit).

It has three courthouses, at Benton, Cairo, and East St. Louis. At present, four judges are assigned to this district.

History 
 The United States District Court for the District of Illinois was established by a statute passed by the United States Congress on March 3, 1819, . The act established a single office for a judge to preside over the court. Initially, the court was not within any existing judicial circuit, so the district court exercised the jurisdiction of both a district court and a circuit court, with appeals and writs of error taken directly to the United States Supreme Court. In 1837, Congress placed the District of Illinois within the newly created Seventh Circuit, and the district court resumed its normal jurisdiction, .

The Southern District itself was created by a statute passed on February 13, 1855, which subdivided the District of Illinois into the Northern and the Southern Districts. The boundaries of the District and the seats of the courts were set forth in the statute: 

The district has since been re-organized several times. It was later eliminated in a reorganization on October 2, 1978 which replaced it with a Central District, formed primarily from parts of the Southern District, and returning some counties to the Northern District.

Jurisdiction 
The jurisdiction of the Southern District of Illinois comprises the following counties: Alexander, Bond, Calhoun, Clark, Clay, Clinton, Crawford, Cumberland, Edwards, Effingham, Fayette, Franklin, Gallatin, Hamilton, Hardin, Jackson, Jasper, Jefferson, Jersey, Johnson, Lawrence, Madison, Marion, Massac, Monroe, Perry, Pope, Pulaski, Randolph, Richland, Saline, St. Clair, Union, Wabash, Washington, Wayne, White, and Williamson. The district was created in 1979. It has jurisdiction over the eastern suburbs of St. Louis and the city of Carbondale.

The United States Attorney's Office for the Southern District of Illinois represents the United States in civil and criminal litigation in the court. The current United States Attorney is Rachelle Crowe, who was sworn in on June 21, 2022.

Current judges 
:

Former judges

Chief judges

Succession of seats

United States Attorneys for the Southern District of Illinois 

The United States Attorney's Office for the Southern District of Illinois is the federal prosecuting office for cases arising in 38 counties in Southern Illinois. The Office is headquartered in Fairview Heights and also has branch offices in Benton and East St. Louis. 

 James R. Burgess* (April 1979 – January 1982)
 Frederick J. Hess* (January 1982 – June 1993)
 Clifford J. Proud (June 1993 – November 1993)
 W. Charles Grace* (December 20, 1993 – January 30, 2002)
 Robert J. Cleary (January 30, 2002 – May 29, 2002)
 Laura J. Jones (May 30, 2002 – August 6, 2002)
 Miriam F. Miquelon* (August 7, 2002 – September 1, 2003)
 Richard E. Byrne (September 2, 2003 – November 15, 2003)
 Ronald J. Tenpas* (November 16, 2003 – November 20, 2005)
 Edward E. McNally (November 21, 2005 – March 11, 2006)
 Randy G. Massey	(March 12, 2006 – November. 4, 2007)
 Courtney Cox (November 5, 2007 – August 26, 2010)
 Stephen R. Wigginton* (August 27, 2010 – December 11, 2015)
 James L. Porter	(December 12, 2015 – July 7, 2016)
 Donald S. Boyce (July 8, 2016 – July 22, 2018)
 Steven D. Weinhoeft (July 23, 2018 – June 21, 2022)
 Rachelle Aud Crowe* (June 21, 2022 – present)

(*) Presidential appointment

See also 
 Courts of Illinois
 List of current United States district judges
 List of United States federal courthouses in Illinois

References

External links 
 United States District Court for the Southern District of Illinois Official Website
 United States Attorney for the Southern District of Illinois Official Website

Illinois, Southern District
Illinois law
Metro East
Carbondale, Illinois
1855 establishments in Illinois
East St. Louis, Illinois
Courthouses in Illinois
Courts and tribunals established in 1855